Unitary may refer to:

Mathematics
 Unitary divisor
 Unitary element
 Unitary group
 Unitary matrix
 Unitary morphism
 Unitary operator
 Unitary transformation
 Unitary representation
 Unitarity (physics)
 E-unitary inverse semigroup

Politics
 Unitary authority
 Unitary state

See also
 Unital (disambiguation)
 Unitarianism, belief that God is one entity